Intermediate Model for the Arch is a 1975 painted steel sculpture by Alexander Calder, installed in a courtyard outside the Columbus Museum of Art in Columbus, Ohio, United States. The artwork measures 144 in. x 129 in. x 101 in. and was purchased by the Derby Fund.

See also
 1975 in art

References

1975 sculptures
Abstract sculptures in the United States
Columbus Museum of Art
Downtown Columbus, Ohio
Outdoor sculptures in Columbus, Ohio
Sculptures by Alexander Calder
Steel sculptures in Ohio